Miss Brown of X. Y. O. is a 1927 mystery thriller novel by the British writer E. Phillips Oppenheim. It was notable amongst thrillers of the time for its use of an everyday female character as heroine.

Synopsis
Miss Brown is a respectable London-based typist is walking through the fog-covered streets of Kensington when she is urgently called in to type down a letter for Colonel Dessiter who has just killed a foreign spy and has been shot himself in the process. The message reveleas an anarchistic plot to plunge Europe into a fresh war.

References

Bibliography
 Betz, Phyllis M. Reading the Cozy Mystery: Critical Essays on an Underappreciated Subgenre. McFarland, 2021.
 Ehland, Christoph & Wachter, Cornelia. Middlebrow and Gender, 1890-1945. BRILL,  2016.
 Reilly, John M. Twentieth Century Crime & Mystery Writers. Springer, 2015.

External links
 Full text of Miss Brown of X.Y.O. at HathiTrust Digital Library

1927 British novels
Novels by E. Phillips Oppenheim
British thriller novels
British mystery novels
Hodder & Stoughton books
Novels set in London
Little, Brown and Company books